Yi Shanjun (born 14 July 1977) is a Chinese wrestler. He competed in the men's Greco-Roman 63 kg at the 2000 Summer Olympics.

References

1977 births
Living people
Chinese male sport wrestlers
Olympic wrestlers of China
Wrestlers at the 2000 Summer Olympics
Place of birth missing (living people)
Wrestlers at the 1998 Asian Games
Asian Games bronze medalists for China
Medalists at the 1998 Asian Games
Asian Games medalists in wrestling
20th-century Chinese people
21st-century Chinese people